Adolph Strouf (May 20, 1878 – October 4, 1961) was an American politician and businessman.

Born in the town of Gibson, Manitowoc County, Wisconsin, Strouf farmed in Two Rivers, Wisconsin and was an insurance salesman. He was involved with the telephone company, farm organizations, and the insurance business. Strouf served as the Gibson Town Board chairman and on the Manitowoc County Board of Supervisors. In 1949, Strouf served in the Wisconsin State Assembly and was a Democrat. He died of a heart attack at his home in Two Rivers, Wisconsin.

Notes

1878 births
1961 deaths
People from Manitowoc County, Wisconsin
Businesspeople from Wisconsin
Farmers from Wisconsin
Mayors of places in Wisconsin
Democratic Party members of the Wisconsin State Assembly
People from Two Rivers, Wisconsin